In the field of mathematics known as complex analysis, the indicator function of an entire function indicates the rate of growth of the function in different directions.

Definition

Let us consider an entire function .

The indicator function can be also defined for functions which are not entire but analytic inside an angle .

Basic properties

By the very definition of the indicator function, we have that the indicator of the product of two functions does not exceed the sum of the indicators:

Similarly, the indicator of the sum of two functions does not exceed the larger of the two indicators:

Examples

Elementary calculations show that, if , then . Thus,

In particular,

Another easily deducible indicator function is that of the reciprocal Gamma function. However, this function is of infinite type (and of order ), therefore one needs to define the indicator function to be

Stirling's approximation of the Gamma function then yields, that

Another example is that of the Mittag-Leffler function . This function is of order , and

Further properties of the indicator

Those  indicator functions which are of the form

If , we simply say, that  is trigonometrically convex.

Such indicators have some special properties. For example, the following statements are all true for an indicator function that is trigonometrically convex at least on an interval 

Moreover, the left-hand-side derivative is not greater than the right-hand-side derivative. It also holds true, that the right-hand-side derivative is continuous from the right, while the left-hand-side derivative is continuous from the left.

Notes

References

 
 

Complex analysis